Chuang Chia-jung and Lisa Raymond won in the final 6-2, 6-4 against Chanelle Scheepers and Abigail Spears.

Seeds

Draw

External links
Main Draw

HP Open
- Doubles, 2009 Hp Open